Pseudobacter is a Gram-negative, pseudo-rod and non-spore-forming genus of bacteria from the family of Chitinophagaceae with one known species (Pseudobacter ginsenosidimutans ). Pseudobacter ginsenosidimutans has been isolated from soil from a ginseng field from Korea.

References

Chitinophagia
Bacteria genera
Monotypic bacteria genera
Taxa described in 2016